The Asian Basketball Club Championship 1981 was the 1st staging of the Asian Basketball Club Championship, the basketball club tournament of Asian Basketball Confederation. The tournament was held in Queen Elizabeth Stadium, Hong Kong from March 28 to April 5, 1981.

Results

Final standing

References
Fibaasia.net

1981
Champions Cup
B
Basketball Asia Champions Cup 1981